The Martschenspitz (also known as Pizzo Stella) is a mountain of the Lepontine Alps on the border between Switzerland and Italy. On its southern side it overlooks the pass Guriner Furggu. The closest locality is Bosco/Gurin in Ticino. Its summit is 2688m high, and is popular with mountain climbers.

References

External links
 Martschenspitz on Hikr

Mountains of the Alps
Mountains of Switzerland
Mountains of Italy
Italy–Switzerland border
International mountains of Europe
Mountains of Ticino
Lepontine Alps